Transgender asylum seekers are transgender persons seeking refuge in another country due to stigmatization or persecution in their home countries, including physical and sexual assault, torture, "conversion therapy" practices, and even imprisonment. They may be fleeing from state-sponsored discrimination or from social isolation. Transgender people face challenges in the asylum process not experienced by others.

Countries of origin 
Transgender persons may have experienced "severe persecution" in the countries they have fled, even where anti-transgender laws do not exist. In one 1999 case, a transgender woman only avoided deportation from the United States after her attorney invoked the United Nations Convention against Torture, making the case that "Amanda was subject to torture under the color of law" in Nicaragua. In another 1999 case, a transgender man was granted asylum in the United States under the reasoning that he would be a "social pariah" in Iraq.

In 2017, Amnesty International released a report on LGBTI people seeking asylum in Mexico, describing El Salvador, Guatemala, and Honduras as being "no safe place" for transgender people. A 2020 public health review determined that transgender women seeking asylum from Mexico were fleeing a situation of "extreme vulnerability."

Treatment while seeking asylum 
In some cases, transgender asylum seekers are at greater risk than others offered refugee status. Although seeking asylum for sexual orientation or gender identity can constitute viable grounds for an asylum claim, "proving" one's identity can be particularly challenging for transgender asylum seekers. In 2022 the United Kingdom arranged for Rwanda to absorb asylum seekers in a highly controversial policy. While this policy has yet to be fully implemented, transgender asylum seekers would be at greater risk in Rwanda than in the United Kingdom due to Rwanda's prosecution of transgender people.

Transgender people may also be at risk while detained in the countries in which they seek asylum. NGOs such as Human Rights Watch, Transgender Europe, and the National Center for Transgender Equality have reported cases of rape and abuse of transgender people in UK, US, Norwegian, and Greek facilities for asylum seekers. In the United States, Immigration and Customs Enforcement places transgender asylum seekers in a "transgender pod" where there is a lack of medical and mental health services.

Asylum outcomes 
When denied asylum, there have been reports of adverse outcomes for transgender persons. According to the ASPIDH Rainbow Trans Association, a transgender woman seeking asylum in the United States was killed in El Salvador weeks after her request was denied. Transgender persons may still face difficulties after being granted asylum because of their gender identity. The Williams Institute reported in 2022 that transgender asylum seekers may be disproportionately harmed by detention practices and face sustained mental health challenges as a result.

Legal issues and political debate 
Globally, asylum laws leave LGBT refugee detainees "particularly susceptible to heightened levels of physical and mental abuse." Transgender refugees in particular suffer from inadequate access to hormone therapy while in the asylum process. In the United States, for example, transgender refugees may only receive hormone treatment if they were already undergoing such treatments before being detained. This lack of access may make them more visible during transition and hence more readily targeted for transphobic abuse.

Since 2000, the United States has recognized transgender asylum seekers as a social group that deserves protection on the basis of gender identity. Despite this, transgender asylum seekers are sometimes disqualified under the United States' criminalization of prostitution even if they are not engaged in criminal activity. The United States' requirement that transgender refugees prove their identity also disadvantages them in the refugee process as many refugees are unable to begin transitioning until arriving in the United States.

Some U.S. political activists have sought to improve conditions for transgender asylum seekers.

See also 

 Asylum seeker
 Transgender rights

References 
\ 

Human rights
Refugees
Transgender rights